Pantherophis obsoletus, also known commonly as the western rat snake, black rat snake, pilot black snake, or simply black snake, is a nonvenomous species of snake in the family Colubridae. The species is native to central North America. There are no subspecies that are recognized as being valid.  Its color variations include the Texas rat snake.  Along with other snakes of the eastern United States, like the eastern indigo snake (Drymarchon couperi) and the eastern racer (Coluber constrictor), it is called “black snake”.

Geographic range
P. obsoletus is found west of the Mississippi River, from eastern and southern Iowa southward through Missouri and Arkansas to western Louisiana, westward to eastern Texas, northward through Oklahoma and eastern Kansas to southeastern Nebraska.

Aside from the usual variety that is black or has patches of black on a lighter background, color variations include

the Texas rat snake, which is a brown-to-black variant, often with tinges of orange or red, that can be found in southern Oklahoma, Texas, and Louisiana.

Habitat
Rat snakes of the genus Pantherophis are diurnally-active and live in a variety of habitats;   some overlap each other. They have adapted to a variety of habitats, including bayou, prairie, and rock outcrops, but they seem to have a particular preference for wooded areas, especially oak trees. Rat snakes are excellent climbers and spend a significant amount of their time in trees. The black rat snake is also a competent swimmer. 

During winter it hibernates in shared dens, often with copperheads and timber rattlesnakes. This association gave rise to one of its common names, pilot black snake, and the superstition that this nonvenomous species led the venomous ones to the den.

Description

It is the largest snake found in Canada. Unofficially, indigo snakes (genus Drymarchon) are known to exceed it, and one wild-caught pine snake (Pituophis melanoleucus), with a portion of its tail missing, measured .

Juveniles are strongly patterned with brown blotches on a gray background (like miniature fox snakes: P. gloydi, P. ramspotti, and P. vulpinus). Darkening occurs rapidly as they grow. Adults are glossy black above with white lips, chin, and throat. Sometimes traces of the "obsolete" juvenile pattern are still discernible in the skin between the scales, especially when stretched after a heavy meal.

Common names
Other common names for P. obsoletus include: gray rat snake, black chicken snake, black coluber, chicken snake, mountain black snake, mountain pilot snake, pilot, rat snake, rusty black snake, scaly black snake, cow snake, schwartze Schlange, sleepy John, and white-throated racer.

Behavior
When not fully grown, rat snakes are subject to predation by many animals, including other snakes. Once they attain maturity, they are readily preyed on by mammalian carnivores (including the American mink, which weighs no more than an adult rat snake) and large birds of prey (especially red-tailed hawks). When startled, they may freeze and wrinkle themselves into a series of kinks. If they feel further threatened, they may flee quickly or tail vibrate (potentially a form of mimicry, which makes them sound like  rattlesnakes). They are also capable of producing a foul-smelling musk, which they will release onto predators if picked up. They spread the musk with their tails in hopes of deterring the threat. When cornered or provoked, black snakes are known to stand their ground and can become aggressive. Utilizing its infamous agility and the great strength of its muscular coils, the black rat snake is sometimes able to overwhelm and kill formidable avian predators such as red-tailed hawks, great horned owls and red-shouldered hawks, though in many cases the bird is able to kill the snake and both combatants may even die.

Feeding

P. obsoletus is a constrictor, meaning it squeezes its prey to the point of cardiovascular collapse due to obstructive shock, coiling around small animals and tightening its grip until the prey can no longer circulate blood and dies of profound hypotension, before being eaten. Though it will often consume mice, voles, and rats, the western rat snake is far from a specialist at this kind of prey and will readily consume any small vertebrate it can catch. Other prey opportunistically eaten by this species can include other snakes (including both those of its own and other species), frogs, lizards, moles, chipmunks, squirrels, juvenile rabbits, juvenile opossums, songbirds, and bird eggs. One snake was observed to consume an entire clutch of mallard eggs. Cavity-nesting bird species are seemingly especially prevalent in this snake's diet. The western rat snake has been noted as perhaps the top predator at purple martin colonies as a single large snake will readily consume a number of eggs, hatchlings, and adults each summer. Several rat snake repelling methods have been offered to those putting up martin houses, but most are mixed in success.

Reproduction

In P. obsoletus mating takes place in late May and early June. The male snake wraps its tail around the female with their vents nearly touching. The male then everts one of its sex organs, a hemipenis, into the female sex organ, the cloaca. The mating lasts a few minutes to a few hours. The eggs hatch about 65 to 70 days later in late August to early October.

Taxonomy
This species has previously been placed (and is still placed by many) in the genus Elaphe, as Elaphe obsoleta. However, Utiger et al. found that Elaphe is broadly construed as paraphyletic, and placed this species in the genus Pantherophis. In addition, because Pantherophis is masculine, the specific epithet becomes the masculine obsoletus. The split of Pantherophis from Elaphe has been further confirmed by additional phylogenetic studies.

In 2001, Burbrink suggested this species be divided into three species based on geographic patterns of mitochondrial DNA diversity. He assigned new common names and resurrected old scientific names, resulting in the following combinations: eastern ratsnake (Elaphe alleghaniensis, now Pantherophis alleghaniensis), central ratsnake (Elaphe spiloides, now Pantherophis spiloides), and western rat snake (Elaphe obsoleta, now Pantherophis obsoletus). However, these three species are not morphologically distinct and overlap in all examined morphological characters. More recent investigations have indicated P. alleghaniensis and P. spiloides interbreed freely in Ontario.

In 2008, Collins and Taggart resurrected the genus Scotophis for Burbrink's three taxa (i.e., Scotophis alleghaniensis, Scotophis spiloides, and Scotophis obsoletus) in response to the findings of Burbrink and Lawson, 2007. The justification for this nomenclatural change has been removed by more recent research.

In captivity
The western rat snake is available captive-bred in the United States pet trade, and it has been bred for mutations such as leucistic, albino, and scaleless. However, it is not as popular as other colubrids such as corn snakes, kingsnakes, milksnakes, and hognose snakes. Opinions vary on the western rat snake's disposition, but captive-bred individuals are reported to be more docile than their wild counterparts. With appropriate care, this species may be expected to live 15 years in captivity, and possibly more.

References

Further reading

Say T (1823). In: James E (1823). Account of an Expedition from Pittsburgh to the Rocky Mountains, Performed in the Years 1819 and '20, by Order of the Hon. J.C. Calhoun, Sec'y of War: Under the Command of Major Stephen H. Long. From the Notes of Major Long, Mr. T. Say, and other Gentlemen of the Exploring Party. Vol. I. Philadelphia: H.C. Carey and I. Lea. 503 pp. (Coluber obsoletus, new species, p. 140).

External links

"Black Snakes": Identification and Ecology – University of Florida fact sheet
Black Rat Snake, Reptiles and Amphibians of Iowa

Rat snakes
Snakes of North America
Reptiles of Canada
Reptiles of Ontario
Fauna of the Eastern United States
Reptiles of the United States
Reptiles described in 1823
Taxa named by Thomas Say